Operation Provide Promise was a humanitarian relief operation in Bosnia and Herzegovina during the Yugoslav Wars, from 2 July 1992, to 9 January 1996, which made it the longest running humanitarian airlift in history. 

By the end of the operation, aircraft from 21 countries had flown 12,886 sorties into Sarajevo, delivering 159,622 tons of food, medicine, and supplies and evacuating over 1,300 wounded people. The US flew 3,951 C-130, 236 C-141, and 10 C-17 airland sorties (delivering 62,801.5 tons), as well as 2,222 C-130 air-drop sorties.

See also
 Siege of Sarajevo

Notes

Operation: Provide Promise was not a humanitarian relief effort until at a much later time when hostility in the nearby regions diminished. The Operation became a Task-Force to support. For the Air Force, humanitarian drops were dispatched, but for the army, security and medical units were in support of UN troops deployed in the region.

References
Web

Operation Provide Promise from www.globalsecurity.org
Operation Provide Promise (Bosnia)
Operation Provide Promise: The Airdrop Phase
Operation Provide Promise: Mission Complete
Operation Provide Promise – Women Aid International

Military operations involving the United States
Humanitarian military operations
Military operations involving the United Kingdom
Military operations involving Canada
Bosnia and Herzegovina–United States relations
Bosnia and Herzegovina–United Kingdom relations
Bosnia and Herzegovina–Canada relations
1992 in Bosnia and Herzegovina
1993 in Bosnia and Herzegovina
1994 in Bosnia and Herzegovina
1995 in Bosnia and Herzegovina
1996 in Bosnia and Herzegovina